Waiting on You may refer to:

 "Waiting on You" (Ultra Naté and Michelle Williams song), 2012
 "Waiting on You" (Charlie Major song), 1996
 "Waiting on You" (Lindsay Ell song), 2017
 ...Waiting on You, a 1974 album by Jonathan Kelly's Outside